The 1994 San Jose State Spartans football team represented San Jose State University during the 1994 NCAA Division I-A football season as a member of the Big West Conference. The team was led by head coach John Ralston, in his second year as head coach at San Jose State. They played home games at Spartan Stadium in San Jose, California. The Spartans finished the 1994 season with a record of three wins and eight losses (3–8, 3–3 Big West).

Schedule

Team players in the NFL
No San Jose State Spartans were selected in the 1995 NFL Draft.

The following finished their college career in 1994, were not drafted, but played in the NFL.

Game Summaries

at Fresno State

Baylor

at Stanford

Southwestern Louisiana

at California

at No. 12 Washington

Nevada

at UNLV

New Mexico State

at Louisiana Tech

at Pacific (CA)

Notes

References

San Jose State
San Jose State Spartans football seasons
San Jose State Spartans football